Giuseppe "Pino" Insegno (born 30 August 1959) is an Italian actor, voice actor, comedian and television presenter.

Since 1986, Insegno has been a member of the comedy quartet Premiata Ditta and he also found success dubbing characters into the Italian language and presenting a variety of television shows across Italy.

Biography
Born in Rome, Insegno began his career in 1981 and then eventually in 1986, he became a member of Premiata Ditta alongside Roberto Ciufoli, Francesca Draghetti and Tiziana Foschi. The group performed a variety of comedy sketches on stage, television, and film, most notably the 1995 film . Insegno also appeared in the music video for the song  by Gemelli Diversi on their second album 4x4.

Between the early and mid 2000s, he was one of four presenters of Premiata Teleditta alongside his three colleagues. In 2010, he presented the show Insegnami a sognare and from 2010 to 2013, he presented the Italian version of the French-Canadian game show Action Réaction. He presented these shows for Rai 1. He also presented shows for Mediaset in the past.

Insegno is recognised as a voice actor and dubber. He serves as the official Italian voice of Will Ferrell, having dubbed him in a majority of his films. He also dubbed Viggo Mortensen, Liev Schreiber and Sacha Baron Cohen in some of their movies. He is well known for voicing Stan Smith in the Italian-Language version of American Dad and he performed the Italian voices of Diego in the Ice Age film series, John Smith in Pocahontas and Pocahontas II: Journey to a New World, The Magic Mirror in the Shrek movies, and he also dubbed several characters in The Simpsons.

Personal life
From Insegno's first marriage to actress Roberta Lanfranchi, he had two children as well as another two with his second and current wife Alessia Navarro. He is the older brother of voice actor Claudio Insegno.

Filmography

Cinema
Escape from the Bronx (1983)
In punta di piedi (1984)
Mezzo destro mezzo sinistro - 2 calciatori senza pallone (1985)
A me mi piace (1985)
I giorni randagi (1988)
Le finte bionde (1989)
L'assassino è quello con le scarpe gialle (1995)
Gli angeli di Borsellino (2003)
Il naso (2003)
Ti stramo - Ho voglia di un'ultima notte da manuale prima di tre baci sopra il cielo (2008)
Alta infedeltà (2010)
From the Waist Up (2010)
Una donna per la vita (2011)
Una notte agli studios (2013)
Ovunque tu sarai (2017)

Dubbing roles

Animation
Stan Smith in American Dad!
John Smith in Pocahontas
John Smith in Pocahontas II: Journey to a New World
Diego in Ice Age
Diego in Ice Age: The Meltdown
Diego in Ice Age: Dawn of the Dinosaurs
Diego in Ice Age: Continental Drift
Diego in Ice Age: Collision Course
Lord Business / "The Man Upstairs" in The Lego Movie
Lord Business / "The Man Upstairs" in The Lego Movie 2: The Second Part
Sinbad in Sinbad: Legend of the Seven Seas
Boog in Open Season
Boog in Open Season 2
Boog in Open Season 3
Boog in Open Season: Scared Silly
Chick Hicks in Cars
Chick Hicks in Cars 3
Magic Mirror in Shrek
Magic Mirror in Shrek 2
Magic Mirror in Shrek Forever After
Rafael in Rio
Rafael in Rio 2
Louis in The Princess and the Frog
Gomez Addams in The Addams Family
Ranger in Free Birds
Ned Flanders (2nd voice) / Moe Szyslak (2nd voice) in The Simpsons
Cooking Channel Narrator in Ratatouille
Big Daddy in Sing
Elgin in Rango
Stabbington brothers in Tangled
King Peppy in Trolls
Freaky Fred in Courage the Cowardly Dog

Live action
Buddy Hobbs in Elf
Jacobim Mugatu in Zoolander
Jacobim Mugatu in Zoolander 2
Ron Burgundy in Anchorman: The Legend of Ron Burgundy
Ron Burgundy in Anchorman 2: The Legend Continues
Brennan Huff in Step Brothers
Rick Marshall in Land of the Lost
Harold Crick in Stranger than Fiction
Jack Wyatt / Darrin Stephens in Bewitched
Allen Gamble in The Other Guys
Brad Whitaker in Daddy's Home
Brad Whitaker in Daddy's Home 2
Ricky Bobby in Talladega Nights: The Ballad of Ricky Bobby
Chazz Reinhold in Wedding Crashers
Big Earl in Starsky & Hutch
Sherlock Holmes in Holmes & Watson
James King in Get Hard
Franz Liebkind in The Producers
Cam Brady in The Campaign
Kevin in The Internship
Hobie in Melinda and Melinda
Scott Johansen in The House
Chazz Michael Michaels in Blades of Glory
Jackie Moon in Semi-Pro
Will Ferrell in Between Two Ferns: The Movie
Lars Erickssong in Eurovision Song Contest: The Story of Fire Saga
Aragorn in The Lord of the Rings: The Fellowship of the Ring
Aragorn in The Lord of the Rings: The Two Towers
Aragorn in The Lord of the Rings: The Return of the King
Borat Sagdiyev in Borat
Borat Sagdiyev in Borat Subsequent Moviefilm
Brüno Gehard in Brüno
Ali G in Ali G Indahouse
Admiral General Aladeen / Efawadh in The Dictator
Frank Hopkins in Hidalgo
Tom Stall in A History of Violence
Sigmund Freud in A Dangerous Method
Victor Creed in X-Men Origins: Wolverine
Vincent Campbell in The Last Days on Mars
Stuart Besser in Kate & Leopold
Muhammad Ali in Ali
Marty Baron in Spotlight
Nikolai Luzhin in Eastern Promises
Everett Hitch in Appaloosa
Man in The Road
Old Bull Lee in On the Road
Chester MacFarland in The Two Faces of January
Ben Cash in Captain Fantastic
Inspector Gustave Dasté in Hugo
Monsieur Thénardier in Les Misérables
Colonel Alexander Vosch in The 5th Wave
Ned Freed in Every Day
Theodore Winter in Salt
Bobby Lincoln in The Reluctant Fundamentalist
Lyndon B. Johnson in The Butler
Dovi in Fading Gigolo
Boris Spassky in Pawn Sacrifice
Kyle Alan "Nobby" Butcher in Grimsby
Time in Alice Through the Looking Glass
Abbie Hoffman in The Trial of the Chicago 7
Sean Dignam in The Departed
Elliot Moore in The Happening
Max Payne in Max Payne
Cinna in The Hunger Games
Cinna in The Hunger Games: Catching Fire
Andy Hanson in Before the Devil Knows You're Dead
Caesar in Rise of the Planet of the Apes
Edgar Areola in Sicario
Tommy Callahan III in Tommy Boy
Mike Donnelly in Black Sheep
Link in The Matrix Reloaded
Link in The Matrix Revolutions
Indiana Jones in Indiana Jones and the Raiders of the Lost Ark (2009 redub)
Vito Corleone in The Godfather Part II (2007 redub)
Mambrú in A Perfect Day

Video games
Ethan Mars in Heavy Rain
Aragorn in The Lord of the Rings: The Two Towers
Aragorn in The Lord of the Rings: The Third Age
Chen Stormstout in World of Warcraft

References

External links

1959 births
Living people
Male actors from Rome
Italian male voice actors
Italian male film actors
Italian male stage actors
Italian male television actors
Italian male video game actors
Italian television presenters
Italian male comedians
Italian voice directors
20th-century Italian male actors
21st-century Italian male actors
20th-century Italian comedians
21st-century Italian comedians